The Mongolian five-toed jerboa or Siberian jerboa (Allactaga sibirica) is a species of rodent in the family Dipodidae.
It is found in China, Kazakhstan, Mongolia, and Turkmenistan.

References

Allactaga
Rodents of Asia
Taxonomy articles created by Polbot
Mammals described in 1778